The American Skaters Guild was the first skating teachers organization in North America. On August 10, 1938, a meeting took place of thirteen prominent figure skating coaches from the U.S. and Canada. The meeting took place in Lake Placid, N.Y. and was for the purpose of forming an association of professional figure skaters. The goals of this new organization were to provide mutual protection to the coaches and the clubs employing them, and to foster better relationships with the clubs and the United States Figure Skating Association. The group discussed the formulations of methods of ascertaining the competency of figure skating instructors by giving them tests directly associated with their actual teaching ability. Yearly dues of $5.00 were tentatively approved and officers were appointed, also temporarily. Willy Boeckl was elected President (the spelling was changed from Willy Böckl sometime after he arrived in the United States); Willie Frick, 1st Vice-President; Walter Arian, 2nd Vice-President.

The second annual meeting of the American Skaters Guild was held August 7 at the Olympic Arena, Lake Placid, N.Y. At this meeting, a motion was passed to conduct strict tests for all new skaters entering the field of instruction.  The first of these tests was planned to be held at an early date at Iceland Rink in New York City.

By the 1940–41 season the guild boasted among its 43 members some of the most elite instructors of the time: Walter Arian, Toronto Skating Club; Norval Baptie, Chevy Chase Ice Palace; Willy Boeckl, The Skating Club, Inc.; Willie Frick, The Skating Club of Boston; Gustav Lussi, Philadelphia Skating Club & Humane Society; Maribel Vinson Owen, East Bay Iceland; Nathan Wally, Cleveland Skating Club; and Edi Scholdan, Boston Arena. Edi Scholdan and Maribel Vinson Owen were later killed on their way to the 1961 World Championships when their plane, Sabena Flight 548 crashed on approach just outside Brussels, Belgium.

Between 1942 and 1945, the guild was inactive as World War II was in full swing. USFSA qualifying events were still held during this period, and while the Ladies, Pairs, and Dance events were held, there were no Senior Men's events held between 1944 and 1945.

The year 1946 brought back a revival for the guild. Howard Nicholson was voted in as Chairman (President) and in 1949 a working committee was elected to reorganize the guild. Meeting in the fall, the group drew up a proposed constitution and by-laws. Included in the proposal was a name change.

On January 21, 1950, at the Broadmoor in Colorado Springs, the guild was reorganized and renamed the Professional Skaters Guild of America. In May 1995, it once again changed its name, this time to the Professional Skaters Association, International.

References

Figure skating organizations
Sports organizations established in 1938